Events in the year 1828 in India.
Raja Rammoyan Roy founded Brahmo Sabha in 1828; it was later renamed Brahmo samaj.

Incumbents
The Hon. W. Butterworth Bayley, Governor-General.
Lord William Bentinck, Governor-General, 1828-35.

Law
Criminal Law (India) Act (British statute)

Births
Rani Lakshmibai, Queen of Jhansi (probable year; died 1858)

References

 
India
Years of the 19th century in India